Borodino was an 1812 battle in the Napoleonic Wars during the French invasion of Russia.

Borodino may also refer to:

Places
Borodino, Krasnoyarsk Krai, Russia
Borodino (village), Mozhaysky District, Moscow Oblast, Russia, namesake of the Battle of Borodino
Borodino, Perm Krai, Russia
Borodino, Kameshkovsky District, Vladimir Oblast, Russia
Borodino, Suzdalsky District, Vladimir Oblast, Russia
Borodino, Vyaznikovsky District, Vladimir Oblast, Russia
Borodino, Volgograd Oblast, Russia
Borodino, Odesa Oblast, Ukraine
Borodino, New York, a hamlet in the United States
Daitō Islands or Borodino Islands, Japan
Smith Island (South Shetland Islands) or Borodino Island

Ships
Borodino (1813 ship)
Borodino (1826 ship)
Borodino-class battleship, a class of Russian pre-dreadnought battleships
Russian battleship Borodino, the lead ship of the class
Borodino-class battlecruiser, a class of Russian battlecruisers launched during World War I but never completed
Borodino-class motorship, a class of Russian river passenger ships

Other uses
Borodino (poem), a poem by Mikhail Lermontov
3544 Borodino, a main-belt asteroid
Borodino meteorite, a meteorite that fell near Borodino, Russia, in 1812
The Battle of Borodino: Napoleon in Russia 1812, a 1972 board wargame that simulates the 1812 battle

See also
Battle at Borodino Field, a 1941 battle
Borodino, Russia, a list of inhabited localities in Russia
List of ships named Borodino